is a Japanese swimmer. She swam at the 2012 Summer Olympics in the 200 m individual medley.

References 

1990 births
Living people
Japanese female medley swimmers
Olympic swimmers of Japan
Swimmers at the 2012 Summer Olympics
People from Fukushima, Fukushima
Swimmers at the 2010 Asian Games
Universiade medalists in swimming
Sportspeople from Fukushima Prefecture
Universiade gold medalists for Japan
Asian Games competitors for Japan
Medalists at the 2011 Summer Universiade
21st-century Japanese women